Tito Puente Swings, The Exciting Lupe Sings, also known as La exitante Lupe canta con el maestro Tito Puente is an album by La Lupe and Tito Puente. It was released by Tico Records in 1965. AllMusic gave the album a rating of two-and-a-half stars.

Track listing
Side A
 "Todo" (A. Alguerod) [2:00]
 "Yo No Lloro Mas" (Myrta Silva) [2:58]
 "Bomba Na' Ma'" (Rafael Davila) [2:44]
 "Adios" (A. Alguerod) [2:50]
 "Menealo (Tiene La Azucar Abajo)" (Luis Kalaff) [3:04]
 "Homenaje a Juan Vicente" (Billo Formeta) [2:38]

Side B
 "Jala Jala" (Roberto, Andy, Pellin) [2:14]
 "Maria Dolores" (A. Alguerod) [3:43]
 "Mi Socio" (Rafael Davila) [2:38]
 "Que te Pedi" (Mullens, de la Fuente) [3:45]
 "Junto a Ti" (A. Alguerod) [3:08]
 "Elube Chango" (Alberto Rivera) [2:15]

References

1966 albums
Tico Records albums
Tito Puente albums